The Sievers family is a noble Baltic German family that owned a number of estates in the present-day Baltic States, including the Wenden Castle. It hails from the Duchy of Holstein.

 Karl von Sievers (1710–74) owed his rise to a brief liaison with Tsarina Elisabeth. He was made a Count of the Holy Roman Empire in 1760.
 His daughter Elisabeth (1746-1818) captivated Giacomo Casanova but married her cousin Jacob Sievers who administered the north-west of modern-day Russia and built the Sievers Canal connecting the Msta and Volkhov rivers. Her second husband was Prince Nikolai Putyatin. She also had a natural daughter who married historian Nikolai Karamzin.
 Jacob's nephews Karl, Johann and Jacob were all generals prominent in the Russian service during the Napoleonic Wars.
Count Emanuel von Sievers (1817-1909) a senator of the Russian Empire and grand master of the imperial court.

External links 
 http://www.sivers-familienverband.de/
 

Baltic-German people
Baltic nobility
Russian noble families
Danish noble families
Latvian nobility
Latvian noble families

it:Sievers (cognome)